Azincourt, historically known in English as Agincourt, is a commune in the Pas-de-Calais department in northern France.

The Late Medieval Battle of Agincourt between the English and the French took place in the commune in 1415.

Toponym
The name is attested as Aisincurt in 1175, derived from a Germanic masculine name Aizo, Aizino and the early Northern French word curt (which meant a farm with a courtyard; derived from the Late Latin cortem). The name has no etymological link with Agincourt, Meurthe-et-Moselle (attested as Egincourt 875), which is derived separately from another Germanic male name *Ingin-.

History
Azincourt is known for being near the site of the battle fought on 25 October 1415 in which the army led by King Henry V of England defeated the forces led by Charles d'Albret on behalf of Charles VI of France, which has gone down in history as the Battle of Agincourt. According to M. Forrest, the French knights were so encumbered by their armour that they were exhausted even before the start of the battle.

Later on, when he became king in 1509, Henry VIII is supposed to have commissioned an English translation of a Life of Henry V so that he could emulate him, on the grounds that he thought that launching a campaign against France would help him to impose himself on the European stage. In 1513, Henry VIII crossed the English Channel, stopping by at Azincourt.

The battle, as was the tradition, was named after a nearby castle called Azincourt.  The castle has since disappeared and the settlement now known as Azincourt adopted the name in the seventeenth century.

John Cassell wrote in 1857 that "the village of Azincourt itself is now a group of dirty farmhouses and wretched cottages, but where the hottest of the battle raged, between that village and the commune of Tramecourt, there still remains a wood precisely corresponding with the one in which Henry placed his ambush; and there are yet existing the foundations of the castle of Azincourt, from which the king named the field."

Population

Sights
The original battlefield museum in the village featured model knights made out of Action Man figures. This has now been replaced by the Centre historique médiéval d'Azincourt (CHM)a more professional museum, conference centre and exhibition space incorporating laser, video, slide shows, audio commentaries, and some interactive elements. The museum building is shaped like a longbow similar to those used at the battle by archers under King Henry.

Since 2004 a large medieval festival organised by the local community, the CHM, The Azincourt Alliance, and various other UK societies commemorating the battle, local history and medieval life, arts and crafts has been held in the village. Prior to this date the festival was held in October, but due to the inclement weather and local heavy clay soil (like the battle) making the festival difficult, it was moved to the last Sunday in July.

International relations

Azincourt is twinned with Middleham, United Kingdom.

See also
 Communes of the Pas-de-Calais department
 The neighbourhood of Agincourt, Toronto, Canada, named for Azincourt, not Agincourt, Meurthe-et-Moselle

References

Communes of Pas-de-Calais
Artois